Best of Motörhead is a 2002 compilation DVD featuring the British heavy metal band Motörhead, filmed while they were under contract to Bronze Records in 1978 to 1984. The video was originally released in 1986 as Deaf Not Blind, although with a slightly different programme. The performances are filmed in a live concert setting, although the band mime to studio recordings from the albums.

Track listing

Deaf Not Blind

The Best of Motörhead

Credits
 Lemmy (Ian Kilmister) – bass, vocals
 Fast Eddie Clarke – guitar, vocals
 Philthy Animal Taylor – drums
 Brian Robertson – guitar
 Phil Campbell – guitar
 Würzel (Michael Burston) – guitar
 Pete Gill – drums

Deaf Not Blind
Tracks 1-9: 1980: Lemmy; Eddie Clarke; Phil Taylor
Track 10: Promotional video: Lemmy; Eddie Clarke; Phil Taylor
Tracks 11-13: 1983: Lemmy; Brian Robertson; Phil Taylor
Track 14: Promotional video: Lemmy; Wurzel; Phil Campbell; Pete Gill

Motörhead video albums